Heinrich Eduard von Lade (24 February 1817 – 7 August 1904) was a German banker and amateur astronomer.

He was born in Geisenheim, located along the banks of the Rhine river, the son of a wine merchant. He worked as a banker and exporter in Hamburg and Paris, and by the age of 44 he had earned enough to retire.

In 1861 he built a private estate Monrepos in Geisenheim. There he dedicated himself to culturing fruit and wine, and established a school at the site to teach the art. He also built an observatory on the estate to pursue his interest in selenography, or mapping the Moon.

He commissioned the construction of a lunar globe with one side in physical relief and the other with hashed relief and the crater names. This globe is now a very rare collector's item.

In 1901 he was elevated to nobility and became a baron. He died in Geisenheim, which is still famous for its wine and the Geisenheim Grape Breeding Institute.

Honors
The crater Lade on the Moon is named after him, as is the asteroid 340 Eduarda.

External links

 Planetaria

1817 births
1904 deaths
19th-century German astronomers
People from the Rheingau